Étienne Mathieu (November 21, 1804 – January 16, 1872) was a farmer, land owner and political figure in Quebec. He represented L'Assomption in the Legislative Assembly of Quebec from 1867 to 1871 as a Conservative.

He was born in Lachenaie, Lower Canada, the son of Jean-Marie Mathieu and Josephte Quenneville. Mathieu was educated at the Collège Masson à Terrebonne. In 1830, he married Josephte Duprat. He was a major in the militia, a justice of the peace and president of the agricultural society at Lachenaie. He was also a school commissioner and was mayor of Lachenaie from 1867 to 1869. Mathieu died in Lachenaie at the age of 67.

References 
 

1804 births
1872 deaths
Conservative Party of Quebec MNAs
Mayors of places in Quebec
People from Terrebonne, Quebec